Bear Creek is a stream in Richland and Sauk counties, in the U.S. state of Wisconsin. It is a tributary of the Wisconsin River.

Bear Creek was named from the bears seen there by early settlers. The creek lends its name to the town of Bear Creek, Sauk County, Wisconsin.

See also
List of rivers of Wisconsin

References

Rivers of Richland County, Wisconsin
Rivers of Sauk County, Wisconsin
Rivers of Wisconsin